Srednik is a dispersed settlement in the hills north of Šentjanž in the Municipality of Sevnica in east-central Slovenia. The area is part of the historical region of Lower Carniola and is now included in the Lower Sava Statistical Region.

References

External links
Srednik at Geopedia

Populated places in the Municipality of Sevnica